Szczuki may refer to the following places:
Szczuki, Łódź Voivodeship (central Poland)
Szczuki, Masovian Voivodeship (east-central Poland)
Szczuki, Podlaskie Voivodeship (north-east Poland)